Tai Romyen National Park is in the east of Surat Thani Province in southern Thailand. The park consists of the northern end of the Nakhon Si Thammarat mountain range and is mostly covered with forests. It was established on 31 December 1991 and covers an area of 265,625 rai ~  in the districts Kanchanadit, Ban Na San, and Wiang Sa.

The area, especially around the hill, Khao Chong Chang, was a stronghold of communist rebels in the 1980s. From here they succeeded in killing Princess Vibhavadi Rangsit in 1977 as well as the vice-governor of Surat Thani. When the rebellion ceased in the early–1990s due to an amnesty program called Tai Romyen (literally, "cool shade in the south") and it was again safe to visit the area, the national park was established. The park was then named after the amnesty program.

Attractions in the park are the two waterfalls Muang Thuat and Than Thip, as well as the Khamin Cave. Also two former camps of the communist party can be visited, named Camp 180 and Camp 357.

See also
List of national parks of Thailand
List of Protected Areas Regional Offices of Thailand

References

Tenasserim Hills
National parks of Thailand
Protected areas established in 1991
Geography of Surat Thani province
Tourist attractions in Surat Thani province
1991 establishments in Thailand